The MP35 (Maschinenpistole 35, literally "Machine Pistol 35") was a submachine gun used by the Wehrmacht, Waffen-SS and German police both before and during World War II. It was developed in the early 1930s by Emil Bergmann (son of Theodor Bergmann) and manufactured at the Bergmann company in Suhl (that also built one of the first submachine guns, the MP 18).

History
The forerunner of the MP35 was the MP32 that Danish company Schultz & Larsen produced (under licence from the Bergmann company) and which was chambered for 9×23mm Bergmann ammunition. The BMP32 design was later updated by the Bergmann factory and in 1934, the Bergmann MP34 submachine gun appeared (not to be confused with different Steyr MP34). The limited manufacturing capabilities at the Bergmann plant required production to be shifted to Carl Walther's Zella-Mehlis plant. This German company produced some 2,000 BMP34s for export and domestic sales.

Several variants of the BMP34 were manufactured with a 200mm standard or 320mm barrel. During 1935, a simplified version of the BMP34 designated as Bergmann MP35/I appeared. Initial production orders for MP35 were also placed at Walther, which made about 5,000 SMGs between 1936 and 1940.

With the outbreak of World War II, production once again shifted from Walter to Junker & Ruh (manufacture code 'ajf') to manufacture the MP35 weapon (which it did through to 1944). During the war, about 40,000 Bergmann submachine guns were produced by Junker, and almost all were supplied to the Waffen-SS.

Operation
The MP35 was a blowback operated, selective fire SMG which fired from an open bolt. The weapon featured a non-reciprocating cocking handle placed at the rear of the receiver, which was operated in a similar fashion to bolt-action on a Mauser rifle. This involved the weapon carrier to manually pull the handle up, pull backwards, push forwards and lock back down. When the gun was then fired the cocking handle remained stationary.

On the BMP32 the weapon featured a safety at the rear of the bolt (again in a similar location to the Mauser rifle). On both BMP34 and MP35 the safety was relocated to the left side of the receiver. The shooter could select the mode of firing by applying different pressure to the trigger – a short pull fired single shots; a long pull resulted in full automatic fire. Feed was from the right side of the gun, for some mysterious reason, with ejection to the left.

In contrast to many other SMGs of the time the MP35's magazine was inserted from the right-hand side of the weapon. Early versions used proprietary magazines, the BMP35 used Schmeisser MP28-compatible magazines. The barrel was enclosed into tubular jacket with cooling slots and muzzle brake/compensator at the front.

Users 
  - Adopted by the Belgian Army as the Mitraillette 34.
 
  - Known as the MP32 when adopted by the Danish Army in caliber 9×23mm Bergmann.
 
 
   Italian Partisans - Used examples captured from German soldiers
  - Adopted by the Waffen-SS.
 
  - Designated as the M39.
  Yugoslavia - Both Partisans and Chetniks used captured ex-German MP35s.

See also
 Suomi KP/-31
 PPD-40
 PPSh-41
 MP 40

References

External links
 Bergmann's MP35 Submachine Gun Video

Submachine guns of Germany
World War II infantry weapons of Germany
World War II submachine guns
9mm Parabellum submachine guns
Military equipment introduced in the 1930s